Ram Ratan Singh College is a degree college in Bihar, India. It is a constituent unit of Patliputra University. The college offers senior secondary education and undergraduate degrees in arts and science.

History 
The college was established in 1957. It became a constituent unit of Patliputra University in 2018.

Degrees and courses 
The college offers the following degrees and courses.
 Senior secondary
 Intermediate of Arts
 Intermediate of Science
 Bachelor's degree
 Bachelor of Arts
 Bachelor of Science (physics, chemistry, mathematics, zoology and botany honours)

Notable alumni 
 Kanhaiya Kumar, Indian political activist

References

External links 

 Patliputra University website

Constituent colleges of Patliputra University
Educational institutions established in 1957
Universities and colleges in Patna
1957 establishments in Bihar